Dancing Trees (Partners in Crime) is a Canadian drama thriller film directed by Anne Wheeler and written by Joseph Nasser. Its cast features Brooke Burns, Katie Boland and Amanda Tapping.

Martha is an autistic mathematical genius. Suddenly, her mother is viciously murdered before her eyes and she along with her cousin Nichole must use her unique abilities to catch the killer.

References

External links
 

2009 films
English-language Canadian films
Canadian thriller drama films
2009 thriller drama films
2009 drama films
Films about autism
2000s English-language films
2000s Canadian films